Helga Niemann (born 7 February 1956) is a German former swimmer. She competed in the women's 400 metre individual medley at the 1972 Summer Olympics.

References

1956 births
Living people
German female swimmers
Olympic swimmers of West Germany
Swimmers at the 1972 Summer Olympics
Sportspeople from Bonn
German female medley swimmers